Central Railroad & Banking Co. of Ga. v. Pettus, 113 U.S. 116 (1885), was an appeal from a decree of the Circuit Court of the United States for the Middle district of Alabama in favor of the appellees, Pettus & Dawson and Watts & Sons, adjudging them entitled to the sum of, 161.21, and interest thereon at eight percent per annum from March 7, 1881, with lien, to secure its payment, upon the roadbed, depots, side tracks, turnouts, trestles, and bridges owned and used by the appellants, corporations of the State of Georgia, in operating the railroad formerly belonging to the Montgomery and West Point Railroad Company, an Alabama corporation, and which extends from Montgomery to West Point with a branch from Opelika to Columbus. This property was directed to be exposed to sale unless within a given time the said amount was paid. This suit is the outgrowth of certain litigation in the courts of Alabama relating to the before-mentioned and other railroad property in which the appellants are interested.

Summary

On September 1, 1870, the Western Railroad Company, an Alabama corporation, purchased and took possession of the railroad (main line and branch) and all other property of the Montgomery and West Point Railroad Company, one of the terms and conditions of such purchase being, as was claimed, that the former company assumed the payment of all outstanding debts and obligations of the latter and agreed to issue its capital stock, dollar for dollar, in exchange for stock of the Montgomery and West Point Railroad Company outstanding. 

It was a part of that arrangement that the last-named company should, as it subsequently did, surrender its charter to the state. When this purchase was made, there were, upon the franchises and property of the latter company, two mortgages to secure bonds proposed to be issued—one, June 1866, for 0,000, bonds for the whole of which were issued; the other, May 1, 1868, for 0,000, bonds for, 000 of which were issued. It had also outstanding bonds issued in 1866 and 1867, not secured by mortgage or otherwise. The Western Railroad Company had at the time of its purchase a mortgage of date September 15, 1868, upon its own property and franchises to secure 0,000 of bonds then, or at some subsequent period, guaranteed by the present appellants.

On September 15, 1870, that company executed to Morris and Lowery, trustees, a mortgage upon its property and franchises (including the property transferred to it by the Montgomery and West Point Railroad Company), to secure the payment of, 200,000 of bonds, thereafter to be issued, and of which a large amount was issued, and their payment was also guaranteed by the appellants.

Subsequently, on March 31, 1874, those trustees commenced a suit in the Chancery Court of Montgomery County, Alabama, against the Western Railroad Company, the present appellants, the surviving trustees in the mortgages executed by the Montgomery and West Point Railroad Company, and others. Its object was to procure a sale of the property of the former company, including that purchased from the latter company. A final decree was passed December 18, 1874, ordering a sale, subject, however, to a lien, in respect of the property formerly owned by the last-named company, in favor of the holders of its mortgage bonds, according to their respective priorities, and, in respect of the property of the Western Railroad Company, to a lien in favor of the holders of bonds secured by its mortgage of September 15, 1868. The sale was had, the present appellants becoming the purchasers.

On May 8, 1875, Branch, Sons & Co., H. P. Hoadely, and C. S. Plank—holding bonds of the (old) Montgomery and West Point Railroad Company not secured by mortgage—through Pettus & Dawson and Watts & Sons, their solicitors, exhibited a bill in equity in the same court against the present appellants, the Western Railroad Company, the Montgomery and West Point Railroad Company, and others. They sued for themselves as well as for all other creditors of the last-named company who should come in and make themselves complainants and contribute to the expenses of the suit. Such proceedings were had—the Georgia corporations appearing and making defense—that on May 1, 1877, a final decree was entered by which it was, among other things, adjudged that "the unsecured creditors of the Montgomery and West Point Railroad Company, to which class complainants belong, have a lien" upon the property transferred by it to the Western Railroad Company; that such lien was subordinate to those for the bonds issued under the several mortgages executed by the Montgomery and West Point Railroad Company that were outstanding and unpaid, but superior to that of the mortgage executed by the Western Railroad Company after its said purchase, so far as the property of the Montgomery and West Point Railroad Company was covered by that mortgage, and that the property of all kinds, belonging to the latter company, be sold to satisfy its debts according to priority.

The cause was referred to a register to ascertain and report the amounts due to the complainants and to such other unsecured creditors of the Montgomery and West Point Railroad Company as should prove their claims pursuant to the decree; also the amounts due to holders of bonds issued under its several mortgages. Upon appeal by the two Georgia corporations to the Supreme Court of Alabama, that decree was affirmed. The register thereafter proceeded with its execution. Numerous parties, including the complainants, appeared before him and had their claims registered, the creditors in each instance retaining in their own custody the evidence of their respective demands. The aggregate amount of such claims was very large.

On April 15, 1879, the register not having made his report upon these claims, Pettus & Dawson and Watts & Sons, by leave of the court, filed in the cause their joint petition, alleging in substance that as solicitors specially employed by the complainants, Branch, Sons & Co., Hoadley, and Plank, they prepared and filed the original bill, as well in behalf of themselves as of all other unsecured creditors of the Montgomery and West Point Railroad Company who should come in and contribute to the expenses of the suit; conducted the proceedings to a final decree; represented the same interests in the Supreme Court of Alabama; that their relations to the suit were well known to the Georgia corporations during the whole period of the litigation; that pending the reference before the register, after the rights of complainants and all creditors of the same class had been established by the final decree, those corporations made a secret arrangement with their immediate clients, whereby the claims of the latter were paid in full, principal and interest, and whereby also Branch, Sons & Co. and their co-complainants agreed to withhold from their solicitors the fact of such settlement until the Georgia corporations could buy or settle all other claims of the unsecured creditors of the Montgomery and West Point Railroad Company; that "afterwards said two Georgia companies, defendants to this suit, did buy up or settle the other claims, which had been filed in the cause, under said decree," and, "either jointly or separately, thereby acquired possession and control of said claims so filed;" that they also purchased and settled a large amount of claims, which might have been, but were not, filed with the register; that at the time of such purchase, said Georgia corporations had actual notice that petitioners, as solicitors in that suit, claimed reasonable compensation for such services as they rendered in behalf of the unsecured creditors of the Montgomery and West Point Railroad Company (other than complainants) who should come in and take the benefit of the final decree, and also the benefit of any lien upon said property that should be declared in favor of those creditors, and that in equity they

"were the assignees of a part of each claim as filed to the amount of the reasonable value of the services rendered in said cause by petitioners for the benefit of each holder and owner of such claims respectively."

The prayer of the petition was that an account be taken of the sums thus due to them as solicitors representing the unsecured creditors of the Montgomery and West Point Railroad Company (except the complainants and other named creditors with whom they had special contracts for fees) who received the benefit of their services; that they be declared to have a lien for the value of such services on all the property of that company which had come into the possession of the Georgia corporations, and that so much of it as may be necessary for that purpose be sold to meet the amounts due them.

The register reported, on April 22, 1879, that there were then no bonds or claims in the registry, except one claim, filed in court, as to which he did not report because no one had appeared and requested that it be audited.

Subsequently, April 24, 1879, the Georgia corporations presented their joint petition for the removal of the suit commenced against them by Pettus & Dawson and Watts & Sons (they being the only defendants to the petition filed by the latter) to the circuit court of the United States, in which court it was docketed, and, after answer by the defendants and proof taken, proceeded to final decree. When the cause was removed from the state court, nothing practically remained for determination between the parties to the record except the claim of appellees, citizens of Alabama, to a lien upon the property in question owned by the two Georgia corporations.

Findings

The court below did not err in declaring a lien upon the property in question to secure such compensation as appellees were entitled to receive, for according to the law of Alabama, by one of whose courts the original decree was rendered and by which law this question must be determined, an attorney at law or solicitor in chancery has a lien upon a judgment or decree obtained for a client to the extent the latter has agreed to pay him, or, if there has been no specific agreement for compensation, to the extent to which he is entitled to recover, viz., reasonable compensation for the services rendered. Ex Parte Lehman, 59 Ala. 632; Warfield v. Campbell, 38 Ala. 527. That lien could not be defeated by the corporations which owned the property purchasing the claims that were filed by creditors under the decree. The lien of the solicitor rests by the law of that state upon the basis that he is to be regarded as an assignee of the judgment or decree, to the extent of his fees, from the date of its rendition. This right of the solicitors is superior to any which the defendant corporations acquired subsequent to the decree by the purchase of the claims of unsecured creditors.

It remained only to consider whether the sum allowed appellees was too great. The decree gave them an amount equal to ten percent upon the aggregate principal and interest of the bonds and coupons filed in the cause, excluding those in respect of which there was, between appellees and complainants and others, special contracts for compensation. It is shown that appellees had with the complainants contracts for small retainers and five percent upon the sums realized by the suit. We perceive no reason for this discrimination against creditors who were not parties except by filing their claims after decree. One-half the sum allowed was, under all the circumstances, sufficient.

Decree reversal

The decree was reversed and the cause remanded with directions to modify the decree so as to award to appellees only the sum of, 580, with interest from March 7, 1881, with the benefit of the lien upon the property as established by the decree. Each party will pay his costs in this Court and one-half the cost of printing the record.

See also
List of United States Supreme Court cases, volume 113

References

External links
 
 

United States Supreme Court cases
United States Supreme Court cases of the Waite Court
Railway litigation in 1885
1885 in United States case law
Central of Georgia Railway